Stranvaesia davidiana, the Chinese photinia, is a species of shrub grown as an ornamental plant. Its flowers are white and grow in close clusters, followed by small pome fruits. It originated from east Asia and has been introduced to North America as a garden plant. It is sometimes known as Photinia davidiana.

Gallery

References

Information from Plants for a Future database (under the name Photinia)
Plants for a Future web page  (under the name Photinia)

davidiana